Chirostoma bartoni, the Alberca silverside, is a species of neotropical silverside endemic to the Lerma River basin of Mexico. Typical adult specimens are approximately 7.1 cm in length.

The Alberca silverside was found only in the Alberca Caldera, Guanajuato, Mexico and likely became extinct when the caldera temporarily dried up in August 2006.

The specific name honours Barton Appler Bean (1860-1947) who was Assistant Curator of Fishes at the U.S. National Museum.

References

bartoni
Freshwater fish of Mexico
Taxonomy articles created by Polbot
Fish described in 1896
Fish extinctions since 1500
Taxa named by David Starr Jordan